We Thank Thee is a gospel studio album by Jim Reeves, released in 1962 on RCA Victor.

Track listing

Charts

Certifications

References 

1963 albums
Albums produced by Chet Atkins
Jim Reeves albums
RCA Victor albums